Distrigas may refer to:

 Distrigas, a defunct Belgium natural gas company
 Distrigas of Massachusetts, a Liquified Natural Gas (LNG) operator in North America, owned by GDF Suez
 GDF Suez Romania (former Distrigaz Sud), a Romanian natural gas company
 E.ON Gaz Romania (former Distrigaz Nord), a Romanian natural gas company